The following lists events that happened in 1956 in Iceland.

Incumbents
President – Ásgeir Ásgeirsson
Prime Minister – Ólafur Thors, Hermann Jónasson

Events

Births

21 April – Jóhann Sigurðarson, actor and singer
16 May – Þorbergur Aðalsteinsson, handball player
29 May – Bjarni Friðriksson, judoka
30 July – Árni Sigfússon, politician
15 August – Helgi Ólafsson, chess grandmaster
27 August – Magnús Bergs, footballer
21 September – Jón Gunnarsson, politician.

Deaths

References

 
1950s in Iceland
Iceland
Iceland
Years of the 20th century in Iceland